Richard Milner is an American historian of science and a singer who stars in the musical, Charles Darwin: Live & in Concert.

Publications

References

External links 
 Charles Darwin Live, the Evolving Web Site

Year of birth missing (living people)
Living people
21st-century American historians
21st-century American male writers
American male singers
American male musical theatre actors
American male non-fiction writers